Robert Stephen Hill (born November 6, 1953 in Cebu City, Philippines) is an American harpsichordist and fortepianist. From 1990 to 2018 he was "Professor of Historical Keyboard Instruments, Performance Practice and Chamber Music" at the Hochschule für Musik Freiburg, Germany,  and he now serves as the “Eugene D. Eaton Jr. Chair in Baroque Music Performance” and teaches harpsichord at the University of Colorado Boulder College of Music, in the United States.

Robert Hill studied harpsichord with Gustav Leonhardt at the Amsterdam Conservatory (Soloist Diploma 1974). He completed his Ph.D. thesis about Bach at Harvard University in 1987.

Amongst the awards he has received are: Erwin Bodky Award (1982), a NEA Solo Recitalist Award (1983), and the Noah Greenberg Award (1988), Preis der deutschen Schallplattenkritik (2001), Cannes Classical Award (1999), Diapason d'Or (2008).

The works of Bach are central to his recorded repertoire. He has performed with numerous musicians including Reinhard Goebel, Gottfried von der Goltz, Dmitry Sitkovetsky, Christian Tetzlaff, Kim Kashkashian, Helmut Müller-Brühl, Nicholas McGegan, Thomas Zehetmair; and orchestras such as the Freiburg Baroque Orchestra, Cologne Chamber Orchestra, Northern Sinfonia, etc.

His brother is the instrument-builder Keith Hill.

Writings
 Music and Performance During the Weimar Republic - Chapter 3: "Overcoming Romanticism": On the modernization of twentieth century performance practice
 About Bach - Carl Reinecke’s Performance of Mozart’s Larghetto and the Nineteenth-Century Practice of Quantitative Accentuation

Recordings
 Naxos
 Hänssler Classic
 MDG (Musikproduktion Dabringhaus und Grimm)
 cpo
 DG-Archiv
 Olympia
 Ars Musici
 Music&Arts

References

External links
 Robert Hill Live - Blog
 Youtube channel "earlymus"
 Biography (www.bach-cantatas.com)

American musicologists
American harpsichordists
American classical pianists
American male classical pianists
Fortepianists
American performers of early music
Academic staff of the Hochschule für Musik Freiburg
Harvard University alumni
Living people
1953 births
[[Category:Cebu City
20th-century American pianists
21st-century classical pianists
20th-century American male musicians
21st-century American male musicians
21st-century American pianists